The International Association of Horticultural Producers (AIPH / IAHP) is a trade association dedicated to promoting horticultural producers and held the international garden / flora festivals or expositions.

AIPH aims to put flower, plant and landscaping services on a global agenda, with a vision to:
 Stimulate increased demand for ornamental trees, plants and flowers worldwide.
 Protect and promote the interests of the industry.
 Be an international hub for industry information and knowledge exchange.
 Lead best practice in ornamentals production

History

In 1948, amid strained relationships following the end of the Second World War, a group of representatives from the national grower associations of Western Europe came together in Zurich to form the Association Internationale des Producteurs de l’Horticulture (AIPH).

1990s
At least 4 events were held including the 1999 World Horticultural Exposition in Kunming, China and Expo '90 in Osaka, Japan.

2000s

15 events were held in the 2000s including Floriade 2002 in Haarlemmermeer, Netherlands and an exhibition in Shenyang, China in 2006

2010s

Taipei 2010/2011
The 2010 Taipei International Gardening and Horticulture Exposition was held in Taiwan from 6 November 2010 to 25 April 2011 hosted by the Taipei City Government and the Taiwan Floriculture Development Association (TFDA). This was an A2/B1 classification event

Venlo 2012
In 2012 the Floriade 2012 was held in Venlo. As with other Floriades this was an A1 classification event.

Suncheon 2013
Suncheon Bay Garden Expo 2013 is a A2/B1 classified international horticultural exposition held in Suncheon, South Korea, from 20 April to 20 October, attracted over 4.4 million visitors.

Taichung 2018/2019
Taichung World Flora Exposition is being held in Taichung between 3 November 2018 and 24 April 2019. This is a category A2|B1 event.

2020s
Floriade 2022 will be held between 14 April and 9 October 2022 in Almere with focus on the role of horticulture in city building.

Structure
The AIPH has been formerly headquartered in Theale, but since 2016 is now at the headquarters of the Horticultural Trades Association (HTA) in Oxfordshire.

Exhibitions
AIPH has been approving and regulating International Horticultural Expos, with its partners BIE (www.bie-paris.org), since 1960.

AIPH recognises four different categories of Horticultural Exhibitions, with the following table summarising the main differences between each of them.

Category C includes former Category A2, B1 and B2.

This calendar shows both the approved exhibitions and those applied for http://aiph.org/current-events/

Membership and Committees
A list of AIPH members can be found here http://aiph.org/members/aiph-member-organisations/

All members have the right to sit on a Committee. The Standing Committees include:
 Green City 
 Marketing and Exhibitions 
 Novelty Protection
 Environment and Plant Health
Other active groups include:
 Statistics
 Science and Education

Relationships
AIPH maintains relations with other organisations in the field, including the Community Plant Variety Office (CPVO) of the EU and Ciopora, the International Association of Plants Breeders. In line with the International Union for the Protection of New Varieties of Plants (UPOV) – convention 1991, AIPH lobbies to maintain the rights of growers and to resist legislation that would reduce innovation in the sector.

References

External links
 www.aiph.org

Festival organizations
Garden festivals
Horticultural organizations
Horticultural exhibitions
International horticultural exhibitions
1948 establishments in Switzerland
Organisations based in Oxfordshire
Vale of White Horse